The Professional Ski Instructors of America and American Association of Snowboard Instructors (PSIA-AASI) is a nonprofit education association involved in ski instruction. PSIA-AASI establishes certification standards for snowsports instructors and develops education materials.

PSIA-AASI supports instructional programs in alpine skiing, snowboarding, telemark skiing, cross-country skiing, and para-alpine skiing.

PSIA-AASI’s national office is in Lakewood, Colorado, and there are eight regional divisions across the country: Central, Eastern, Intermountain, Northern Intermountain, Northern Rocky Mountain, Northwest, Rocky Mountain, and Western.

See also 
Skiing and skiing topics
Snowboarding
National Sports Center for the Disabled

External links 
 The Snow Pros - official website

Sports professional associations based in the United States
Skiing organizations

Ski
Skiing in the United States
Snowboarding in the United States
Sports organizations established in 1961
1961 establishments in the United States